Mom's Got a Date with a Vampire is a 2000 American made-for-television horror-comedy film directed by Steve Boyum and starring Caroline Rhea, Matt O'Leary, Charles Shaughnessy, Laura Vandervoort, and Robert Carradine. It aired as a Disney Channel Original Movie, premiering on the Disney Channel on Friday, October 13, 2000.

Plot
13-year-old Adam Hansen (Matt O'Leary) and his best friend Duffy (Jake Epstein) have some tickets for the Headless Horseman concert, and his sister 16-year-old Chelsea (Laura Vandervoort) has a date with her dreamy boyfriend Peter. The only problem is, they are both grounded: Adam is punished because he did not do his homework, instead making up a story using an article from the magazine The Weekly Secret, and Chelsea because she called Adam a dweeb, which their mother, Lynette (Caroline Rhea), happened to hear. Chelsea and Adam will do whatever it takes to get their mother out of the house, so they tell her they want chocolate chip pancakes for breakfast the next morning, so they go to the grocery store where they meet a very mysterious man named Dimitri (Charles Shaughnessy). Everything seems to go according to plan, until their 8-year-old little brother Taylor (Myles Jeffrey) realizes that Dimitri is a vampire.

His brother and sister do not believe Taylor, so he calls Malachi Van Helsing (Robert Carradine), the vampire hunter. The night that their mother goes out with Dimitri, Taylor follows them. Not wanting their mother to come home and extend their punishments, Chelsea and Adam follow Taylor and find him outside the restaurant that Lynette and Dimitri are at. Adam and Taylor make the vampire do the spoon test (a fake test made up by Adam to get Taylor to stop calling Dimitri a vampire). Afterwards, Adam discovers that Taylor's hunch about Dimitri was right when he looks in the mirror and notices Dimitri does not have a reflection. So, along with Chelsea, he sets out to stop Dimitri, who puts their mother in a trance and plans to take her to his mansion. Meanwhile, Malachi Van Helsing arrives and begins to hunt down Dimitri, only to discover that he was being followed by Taylor, who (after learning the spoon test was made up by Adam) had also set out to save his mother from Dimitri.

In the end, Taylor becomes Van Helsing's partner and they arrive to do battle with Dimitri, who has Lynette in a trance, but even together Taylor, Adam, Chelsea and Van Helsing are unable to defeat Dimitri. Dimitri goes to bite a powerless Adam, but he and Chelsea call out to Lynette, breaking her trance (as only true love for someone can break a vampire's trance). She throws Dimitri into his coffin. Van Helsing seals the coffin with silver-plated nails and explains that he plans to send it to a place where it's always sunny. Shortly after Dimitri is sealed up, Van Helsing asks their mother out on a "date", after which Adam, Chelsea and Taylor, believing they have heard the word "date" enough for one night, try to convince her to stay single which is when Lynette confesses, "I date. Just not vampires". Finally, they all decide to go back to the Hansen house for breakfast as the sun is finally rising.

Cast 
 Caroline Rhea as Lynette Hansen, the strict no nonsense divorced mother of Chelsea, Adam, and Taylor. Lynette is overprotective of Taylor.
 Matt O'Leary as Adam Hansen, the 13-year-old protagonist. The lazy middle child of the family.
 Robert Carradine as Malachi Van Helsing. The vampire hunter.
 Laura Vandervoort as Chelsea Hansen, the second 16-year-old main character. The eldest child of the family.
 Myles Jeffrey as Taylor Hansen, the third 8-year-old main character. The youngest of the family.
 Charles Shaughnessy as Dimitri Denatos, the evil vampire of the film.
 Jake Epstein as Duffy, Adam's best friend.
 J. Adam Brown as "Boomer", A boy who likes Chelsea.

See also
 Vampire film

References

External links 
 

2000 television films
2000 films
2000 comedy horror films
2000s fantasy comedy films
Disney Channel Original Movie films
Vampire comedy films
Vampires in television
American horror television films
American comedy television films
Films directed by Steve Boyum
2000s American films